Future University (FU), formerly known as Computer Man College or (CMC), is the first specialized Information and communications technology university in Sudan. Since its establishment in 1991 as Computer Man College, it was considered the first college to introduce an Information Technology program in the region, and within the country , it was the first to introduce a Computer Engineering program and the second to introduce the Telecommunication Engineering and Architecture & Design programs. It was upgraded to a university in August 2010 by the Sudan Ministry of Higher Education and Scientific Research. The university adopts the credit hours system in its education process,  one of the first educational institutes to implement this system in Sudan. It is the first private academic institution in Sudan hosting a UNESCO chair. Currently, the university contains seven faculties, each offering several programs (some running and others proposed).

History

About the founder 
Dr. Abubaker Mustafa Mohammed Khair   the founder and chairman of the Board of Trustees of The Future University, received a B.Sc. in Electrical Engineering, Computer Engineering Communication (University of Belgrade, 1970), M.Sc. in Computer Technology, Computer Systems (American University), Applied Science in Engineering, (George Washington University, 1975), and a Ph.D. in Management of Information Systems (George Washington University).

First years 

The foundation of the college was a result of a huge bounce in the field of information technology. The effect has been reflected in the administrative and economical structure of Sudan and other countries; new concepts were created, such as globalization, knowledge societies, e-commerce and e-government.

During this era, the college embarked on strategic plans to offer three programs: Information Technology, Computer Engineering and Computer Science, and then introduce the Telecommunication Engineering and Architecture & Design programs. CMC is in buildings that are almost 20 years old; Future University's new campus is being constructed.

From CMC to FU 
Upgrading Computer Man College into the new Future University has been requested from  the Sudan Ministry of Higher Education and Scientific Research three times, beginning  15 years ago. 

It was eventually approved in 2010. On the morning of the day after the approval, many of the students reported that they were surprised when they came in the college; because they saw the new sign at the forefront of the buildings saying “Future University” instead of the old “Computer Man College.” On that day, a camel and a number of sheep were sacrificed (i.e. slaughtered) inside the campus, and their meat was given away as charity (Karāma) for the poor and other people in the shape of a good-deed attempt to thank the grace of God that the college has been upgraded.

Faculties 
 Faculty of Information Technology, offering 10-semester B.Sc.degree programs in Information Technology, Knowledge Management,  Knowledge Engineering, Digital Marketing and  Digital Banking, and a six-semester Diploma program in Information Technology.
 Faculty of Computer Science,  with B.Sc.degree programs in Computer Science,  Artificial Intelligence, and  Bio-Informatics, and a   Diploma program in  Telecommunication Engineering. 
 Faculty of Telecommunication and Space Technology, with B.Sc.degree in Telecommunication Engineering and Satellite Engineering.
 Faculty of Engineering, with B.Sc.degree programs in Computer Engineering, Electronics Engineering, Bio-Medical Engineering, Laser Engineering, and Mechatronics Engineering, and  Diploma programs in Computer Engineering,  Electronics Engineering, and Network Engineering .
 Faculty of Architecture,   with B.Sc.degree programs in Architecture & Design .
 Faculty of Geo-Informatics,  with B.Sc.degree programs in  Geo-Informatics and Remote Sensing.
 Faculty of Arts and Design, offering B.Sc.degree programs in Interior Design and Graphic Design and Creative Multimedia .
There are also   Diploma programs in   E-Commerce Technology,  Commerce & Accounting Information Technology, and Internet Design Technology, and one-semester certificate program for  Additional & Continuing Education and International Computer Driving License.

Centers of Excellence 
 Space Technology Center
 FU Alumni
 UNESCO/Cousteau Ecotechnie Chair
 Centre for E-Learning and Software Development (CESD)

The logo 
The current logo of Future University was the winning logo in a contest the university held among the students and staff

The new buildings 

The university has recently started building its new campus  located side by side with the old and current buildings.  It is planned to contain modern lecture rooms, labs, auditorium and libraries, and  accommodate  about 18,000 students. In 2006, the land of the new campus was procured by the college, an area of 20,000 square meters. The cost of construction, equipment, and furnishing the whole new buildings of the campus amounts to be approximately US$60 million. The building has been paused several times for unclear reasons; the chairman of the board stated in an interview that he believes that the whole new buildings will be set up, fully constructed and ready to use by the end of 2011. But as of early 2017, it still has not been constructed and still remains in the foundation phase.

See also 
 List of universities in Sudan
 List of universities in Africa
 Education in Sudan
 Sudanese Universities Information Network
 Association of Sudanese Universities

References

External links 
 
 
 

Universities and colleges in Sudan
Education in Khartoum
Educational institutions established in 1991
Science and technology in Sudan
Scientific organisations based in Sudan
1991 establishments in Sudan